Hans Einar Krokan  (born 18 February 1945) is a Norwegian physician and cancer researcher.

He was born in Folldal. He graduated as dr.med. in 1977, and was appointed professor at the Norwegian University of Science and Technology  from 1993. His research focused on DNA repair.

In 2008 he received the King Olav V's Prize for Cancer Research.

He was decorated Commander of the Order of St. Olav in 2016.

References

1945 births
Living people
People from Folldal
Norwegian oncologists
Academic staff of the Norwegian University of Science and Technology
Members of the Norwegian Academy of Science and Letters
Members of the Norwegian Academy of Technological Sciences